How She Move is a 2007 drama film directed by Ian Iqbal Rashid and starring Rutina Wesley, Clé Bennett and Romina D'Ugo. The film showcases the street culture of step dancing. The film is produced by Celluloid Dreams, Sienna Films, Paramount Vantage and MTV Films.

Plot

Unable to afford the tuition needed to fund her private school education, Rayanna or Raya (Rutina Wesley) returns to her family home in the city while reluctantly re-evaluating her future. Upon learning that the top prize for an upcoming step-dancing competition is $50,000, Raya uses her impressive moves to earn a coveted slot in her good friend Bishop's (Dwain Murphy) predominantly male JSJ crew. Isolated from the local women due to jealousy and separated from her fellow dancers by her sex, the ambitious dancer is subsequently kicked off the team for showing off during a preliminary competition. Now, if Raya has any hope of realizing her medical school dreams, she will have to either earn back Bishop's trust or organize her own dance crew and start over from scratch. In the end, she eventually learns "how she move".

Cast
 Rutina Wesley as Rayana 'Raya' Green
 Dwain Murphy as Bishop
 Clé Bennett as Garvey
 Romina D'Ugo as Selia
 Kevin Duhaney as E.C.
 Shawn Desman as Trey
 Nina Dobrev as Tall Girl In The Bathroom
 Brennan Gademans as 'Quake'
 Merwin Mondesir as Niko Niles
 Tré Armstrong as Michelle
 Jason Harrow as himself
 Jai Jai Jones as Lester Johnson
 Tristan D. Lalla as Manny 'Big Man Manny'
 Daniel Morrison as Wayne
 Keyshia Cole as herself
 DeRay Davis as himself
 Melanie Nicholls-King as Faye Green, Raya's Mom

Production and release
How She Move was originally slated to open in Canada in March 2007, but when it picked up a distribution deal from American companies Paramount Vantage and MTV Films (both owned by Viacom) at the 2007 Sundance Film Festival, the release date was pushed back to allow for reshooting several of the dance sequences, particularly the finale. The film was shot on Super 16mm for $5 million, and Paramount invested another $2 million in the new sequences, re-editing and new sound mix. They created a new soundtrack with American and Canadian hip-hop artists. The film was originally set and shot in Toronto, however; Paramount edited out references of the team travelling from Toronto to Detroit for the dance competition following test audience screenings. They, along with MTV, spent another $10 million in promotion and distribution to 1500 theatres in the United States and 50 in Canada.

Critical reception
How She Move delivered mainly positive critical response. On its Rotten Tomatoes listing, 67% of critics gave it positive response, based on 73 reviews. The critical consensus for the film was "energetic and gritty, despite a formulaic plot".

Home video release
Having been released in U.S. theaters on January 25, 2008, the film was released on DVD on April 29. The film was also released in Australian cinemas on April 10, 2008, and will be available on DVD on September 4.

Streaming
On dec 2019 the film was released online on the Canada Media Fund’s Encore+ YouTube channel.

Soundtrack
According to the film's MySpace page, the official track listing is as follows:

 "G-Slide (Tour Bus)" – Lil Mama feat. Kadar
 "Out Here" – Mayhem Morearty
 "My Boots" – Montell Jordan
 "Perfect" – Carl Henry
 "Jane & Finchin'" – Smugglaz
 "It Don't Make Any Difference To Me" (acoustic version) – Kevin Michael feat. Akil Dasan
 "Hot Hot Hot" – Montell Jordan
 "Reflectionz" – Fenom
 "Ms. Golly" – Lenn Hammond
 "Rude Girl Remix" – Montell Jordan
 "Monster" – Saukrates
 "Work That Stick" – Montell Jordan
 "Still Burnin'" – Fenom
 "Don't Let It Slip Away" – Mood Ruff
 "Tempo" – K Smith
 "Touch it" – Busta

References

External links
 
 
 
 
 

2000s teen drama films
2007 films
American coming-of-age drama films
American teen drama films
Canadian coming-of-age drama films
2000s English-language films
English-language Canadian films
Films scored by Andrew Lockington
Films set in Toronto
Films shot in Toronto
MTV Films films
Paramount Vantage films
American dance films
Canadian dance films
2000s dance films
2007 drama films
Films shot in 16 mm film
2000s American films
2000s Canadian films